The Bluegrass Diaries is an album by Jim Lauderdale, released through Yep Roc Records on September 18, 2007. In 2008, the album won Lauderdale the Grammy Award for Best Bluegrass Album.

Track listing 
 "This Is the Last Time (I'm Ever Gonna Hurt)" (Odie Blackmon, Jim Lauderdale) – 3:01
 "All Roads Lead Back to You" (Lauderdale, Melba Montgomery) – 2:17
 "I Wanted to Believe" (Lauderdale) – 3:41
 "Looking for a Good Place to Land" (Shawn Camp, Lauderdale) – 3:32
 "Can We Find Forgiveness" (Lauderdale) – 3:00
 "Chances" (Odie Blackmon, Lauderdale) – 3:16
 "One Blue Mule" (Lauderdale) – 2:31
 "Are You Having Second Thoughts" (Paul Craft, Lauderdale) – 3:52
 "My Somewhere Just Got Here" (Lauderdale, J.D. Souther) – 2:34
 "It's Such a Long Journey Home" (Lauderdale, Candace Randolph) – 2:56
 "Ain't No Way to Run" (Lauderdale, Melba Montgomery) – 5:11

Personnel 

 Richard Bailey – banjo
 Gina R. Binkley – design
 Ashley Brown – vocal harmony
 Shawn Camp – guitar
 Cia Cherry Holmes – vocal harmony
 Jesse Cobb – mandolin
 Dave Evans – vocal harmony
 Clay Hess – guitar
 Cody Kilby – guitar
 Randy Kohrs – Dobro, producer, engineer, mixing, vocal harmony
 Michael Latterell – engineer
 Jim Lauderdale – composer
 Randy LeRoy – mastering
 David McClister – photography
 Aaron Till – fiddle

References 

2007 albums
Bluegrass albums
Grammy Award for Best Bluegrass Album
Jim Lauderdale albums
Yep Roc Records albums